Luis Jiménez (born 3 March 1947) is a Cuban volleyball player. He competed in the men's tournament at the 1972 Summer Olympics.

References

1947 births
Living people
Cuban men's volleyball players
Olympic volleyball players of Cuba
Volleyball players at the 1972 Summer Olympics
Place of birth missing (living people)